Phyllobrostis calcaria is a moth in the  family Lyonetiidae. It is only known from Pretoria, South Africa.

The wingspan is about 13.5 mm for males.

External links
Revision of the genus Phyllobrostis Staudinger, 1859 (Lepidoptera, Lyonetiidae)

Endemic moths of South Africa
Lyonetiidae
Moths of Africa
Moths described in 1911